Pseudotsuga japonica, the Japanese Douglas-fir, is a species of conifer in the pine family, Pinaceae, that is endemic to Japan. Japanese calls this tree 'Togasawara (トガサワラ)'.

References

External links
Conifers Around the World: Pseudotsuga japonica - Japanese Douglas-Fir.

japonica
Plants described in 1896
Vulnerable plants
Trees of Japan
Taxonomy articles created by Polbot